James McCarthy (born 1 March 1990) is a Gaelic footballer who plays for the Ballymun Kickhams club and for the Dublin county team.

Early life
He was a student at Sacred Heart BNS Ballygall and St Kevin's College in Ballygall.

DCU Career
He attended DCU where he was a defender for the Gaelic football team. In 2012, he won the Sigerson Cup and the O'Byrne Cup with the college.

Ballymun Career
He has won two Dublin Senior Football Championships in 2012 and 2020 with Ballymun. He added a Leinster Senior Club Football Championship to his collection in 2012. The went on to beat Dr. Crokes in the All-Ireland semi-final before losing the 2013 All-Ireland Senior Club Football Final to St Brigid's GAA (Roscommon).

Dublin Career

Under-21
He won the 2010 Leinster Under-21 Football Championship and All-Ireland Under-21 Football Championship with Dublin.

Senior
He made his championship debut for Dublin against Laois in the quarter-final of the 2011 Leinster Championship, winning his first Leinster Senior Football Championship against Wexford at Croke Park in July that year. Dublin progressed to an All-Ireland final against Kerry, and McCarthy won the All-Ireland Senior Football Championship. The game finished on a scoreline of 1-12 to 1-11. McCarthy was nominated for GAA GPA Young Player of the Year for his performances.

Personal Life
His father John was a senior footballer with Dublin who won the All-Ireland Senior Football Championship on three occasions.

As of 2020, he was employed by AIB and lived within two kilometres of Poppintree Park, Albert College Park and Johnstown Park.

Honours
Dublin
All-Ireland Senior Football Championship (8): 2011, 2013, 2015, 2016, 2017, 2018, 2019, 2020
Leinster Senior Football Championship (12): 2011, 2012, 2013, 2014, 2015, 2016, 2017, 2018, 2019, 2020, 2021,2022
National Football League (5): 2013, 2014, 2015, 2016, 2018
All-Ireland Under 21 Football Championship (1): 2010
Leinster Under-21 Football Championship (1): 2010

Ballymun Kickhams
Leinster Senior Club Football Championship (1): 2012
Dublin Senior Football Championship (2): 2012, 2020

DCU
Sigerson Cup (1): 2012
O'Byrne Cup (1): 2012

Individual
All Star (4): 2014, 2017, 2018, 2020
 All-Ireland Senior Football Championship Final Man of the Match (1): 2017
In May 2020, the Irish Independent named McCarthy at number eighteen in its "Top 20 footballers in Ireland over the past 50 years".

References

Living people
1990 births
Allied Irish Banks people
All Stars Awards winners (football)
Ballymun Kickhams Gaelic footballers
DCU Gaelic footballers
Dublin inter-county Gaelic footballers
Winners of eight All-Ireland medals (Gaelic football)